John Thomas Hatch (born September 29, 1994) is an American professional baseball pitcher for the Toronto Blue Jays of Major League Baseball (MLB).

Career

Amateur
Hatch attended Jenks High School in Jenks, Oklahoma. As a junior, he went 7–2 with a 1.60 ERA. He was not drafted out of high school in the 2013 MLB draft, and he enrolled at Oklahoma State University and pitched for the Oklahoma State Cowboys. He pursued a degree in accounting. In 2014, he played collegiate summer baseball with the Bourne Braves of the Cape Cod Baseball League. He did not pitch in 2015 due to a sprained ulnar collateral ligament of the elbow, which did not require surgery. He pitched extensively in 2016, as Oklahoma State reached the 2016 College World Series. In 2016, his junior year, Hatch went 9–3 with a 2.14 ERA in 19 starts, winning the Big 12 Conference Baseball Pitcher of the Year Award.

Chicago Cubs
Hatch was drafted by the Chicago Cubs in the third round, with the 104th overall selection, of the 2016 MLB draft. He signed with the Cubs, receiving a $573,900 signing bonus. He did not pitch in 2016 after signing. He made his professional debut in 2017 with the Myrtle Beach Pelicans of the Class A-Advanced Carolina League, posting a 5–11 record with a 4.04 ERA in 26 starts. Hatch spent the 2018 season with the Tennessee Smokies of the Class AA Southern League, earning Southern League All-Star honors and compiling an 8-6 record with a 3.82 ERA in 26 starts. He returned to Tennessee to start the 2019 season.

Toronto Blue Jays
On July 30, 2019, the Cubs traded Hatch to the Toronto Blue Jays in exchange for David Phelps. He was assigned to the New Hampshire Fisher Cats, with whom he finished the year. Over 27 starts between Tennessee and New Hampshire, he pitched to a 6–13 record with a 4.12 ERA.

Hatch was added to the Blue Jays 40-man roster after the 2019 season. On July 26, 2020, he made his MLB debut. With the 2020 Toronto Blue Jays, Hatch appeared in 17 games, compiling a 3–1 record with 2.73 ERA and 23 strikeouts in 26.1 innings pitched.

On April 22, 2021, Hatch was placed on the 60-day injured list due to right elbow inflammation. He was activated from the injured list on July 6.

References

External links

Oklahoma State Cowboys bio

1994 births
Living people
Baseball players from Oklahoma
Bourne Braves players
Buffalo Bisons (minor league) players
Major League Baseball pitchers
Myrtle Beach Pelicans players
New Hampshire Fisher Cats players
Oklahoma State Cowboys baseball players
Sportspeople from Tulsa, Oklahoma
Toronto Blue Jays players
Tennessee Smokies players